Megalopyge peruana is a moth of the family Megalopygidae. It was described by Walter Hopp in 1935.

References

Moths described in 1935
Megalopygidae